Anaqi Ismit (born 24 August 2001) is a Singaporean professional footballer currently playing as a midfielder for Singapore Premier League side Tanjong Pagar United.

Club

Home United
He made his debut against Albirex Niigata (S).

Career statistics

Club

Notes

International statistics

U19 International caps

Honours

Club
Home United
COE U19 Challenge Cup 3rd place: 2018

References

2001 births
Living people
Singaporean footballers
Association football defenders
Singapore Premier League players
Lion City Sailors FC players